Harewood is an electoral ward of Leeds City Council in north east Leeds, West Yorkshire, covering rural villages including Barwick-in-Elmet, Collingham, Harewood, Scholes and Shadwell.

Boundaries 
The Harewood ward includes the following civil parishes:
Aberford (part of Aberford and District Parish Council)
Barwick-in-Elmet and Scholes
Bardsey cum Rigton
Collingham (Collingham with Linton Parish Council)
East Keswick
Harewood (majority - although south western section of Wigton, including Slaid Hill, sits in Alwoodley ward)
Lotherton cum Aberford (Aberford and District Parish Council)
Parlington (Aberford and District Parish Council)
Scarcroft
Shadwell
Thorner
Wothersome

Councillors 

 indicates seat up for re-election.
* indicates incumbent councillor.

Elections since 2010

May 2022

May 2021

May 2019

May 2018

May 2016

May 2015

May 2014

May 2012

May 2011

May 2010

Notes

References

Wards of Leeds